Pityriasis commonly refers to flaking (or scaling) of the skin. The word comes from the Greek πίτυρον "bran".

Classification
Types include: 
 Pityriasis alba
 Pityriasis lichenoides chronica
 Pityriasis lichenoides et varioliformis acuta
 Pityriasis rosea
 Pityriasis circinata
 Pityriasis rubra pilaris
 Pityriasis versicolor
 Dandruff, historically called Pityriasis capitis
 Pityriasis amiantacea

See also
 Desquamation
 List of cutaneous conditions

References

External links 

Dermatologic terminology